The Ministry of Economy and Finance of Peru is the government ministry responsible for the planning and execution of  economic policies of the Peruvian Government with the goal of optimizing the economic and financial activities of the state, establish macroeconomic activity, and achieve the sustainable growth of the nation's economy. , the minister of Economy and Finance is Alex Contreras.

History
On August 13, 1821, José de San Martín, president of Peru, created the General Secretariat of Finance along with the Chancellery, and the War and Navy Department. The first minister of Finance was Hipólito Unanue.

On March 2, 1969 the fundamental law of the Ministry of Finance, Law Decree Nº 17521, which  gave the basis for the structure and function of the Ministry of Finance and on June 13, 1969 its name was changed to the current Ministry of Economy and Finance.

By the Law Decree Nº 23123 of July 9, 1980, the name of the ministry was changed again to the Ministry of the Economy Finance and Commerce and it was incorporated into the State Department of Commerce which belonged to the Ministry of Industry, Commerce, Tourism, and Integration. On January 30, 1985 the name was changed back to what it is today.

Functions
The ministries main functions are:

To plan, direct, and control affairs relating to fiscal policy, finance, debt, budget and treasury.
To plan, direct, and control the policies of State-run financial agencies as well as harmonize economic activity.
To plan direct and control affairs related to tariffs.
Efficiently manage the public resources of the government.

Ministers
Names and date of taking office.
Hipólito Unanue, 3 August 1821
Dionisio Vizcarra, 23 June 1823
Hipólito Unanue, 24 September 1823
José de Espinar, 19 February 1824
José Faustino Sánchez Carrión, 1 April 1824
Hipólito Unanue, 28 October 1824
José María de Pando, 8 March 1825
Juan Salazar, 20 May 1825
José de Larrea y Loredo, 20 July 1825
José María de Pando, 8 May 1826
José de Larrea y Loredo, 28 June 1826
José María Galdeano, 10 February 1827
José de Morales y Ugalde, 12 February 1827
Francisco J. Mariátegui, 24 June 1827
Manuel Gaspar de Rosas, 10 June 1828
José Gregorio Paredes, 20 June 1828
Dionisio Vizcarra	 	 
Lorenzo Bazo, 6 June 1829
José de Larrea y Loredo, 1 December 1829
Manuel del Río, 20 June 1830
José María de Pando, 21 July 1830
Manuel Pérez de Tudela, 20 December 1831
Manuel Gaspar de Rosas, 29 October 1832
Manuel del Río, 12 November 1832
Joaquín Arrece, 22 November 1832
, 3 January 1833
José Villa, 21 December 1833
, 4 January 1834
José Villa, 24 January 1834
Ildefonso Zavala, 1 March 1834
José de Mendiburú, 29 March 1834
José Villa, 6 May 1834
José de Mendiburú, 5 July 1834
Ildefonso Zavala, 22 October 1834
José de Mendiburú, 25 February 1835
Domingo Espinar, 27 February 1835
Bonifacio de Lazarte, 13 April 1835
José Braulio del Camporedondo, 16 July 1835
Joaquín Arrese, 12 September 1835
, 9 October 1835
Mariano de Sierra, 9 January 1836
Juan García del Río, 25 April 1836
Pío de Tristán, 6 August 1836
Juan García del Río, 17 August 1836
José Gregorio Paredes, 31 January 1837
José María Galdeano, 2 May 1837
Casimiro Olañeta, 17 August 1837
Juan García del Río, 3 November 1837
Manuel del Río, 30 July 1838
Benito Lazo, 1 August 1838
Manuel Ferreyros, 24 August 1838
Lorenzo Bazo, 8 November 1838
Ramón Castilla, 3 March 1839
Manuel Ferreyros, 29 July 1839
Manuel del Río, 3 January 1841
Luciano M. Cano, 16 March 1841
Miguel del Carpio, 16 August 1842
Francisco J. Mariátegui, 31 October 1842
José Luis Goméz Sánchez, 20 March 1843
Pedro Antonio de la Torre, 1 May 1843
Manuel Toribio Ureta, 22 July 1843
, 5 August 1843
Pedro Gamio, 5 January 1844
, 20 May 1844
José Manuel Tirado, 17 June 1844
Domingo Elías, 11 August 1844
Manuel de Mendiburu, 21 April 1846
José Fabio Melgar, 16 July 1849
Juan Crisóstomo Torrico, 20 April 1851
Manuel de Mendiburu, 29 August 1851
Nicolás Fernández de Piérola y Flores, 7 September 1852
Manuel de Mendiburu, 2 January 1854
Pedro Galvez, 7 November 1854
Manuel Toribio Ureta, 5 January 1855
Domingo Elías, 1 February 1855
José Santos Castañeda, 16 October 1856
Francisco de Rivero, 14 February 1857
Manuel Ortíz de Zevallos, 24 October 1857
Juan José Salcedo, 16 December 1858
José Fabio Melgar, 25 July 1861
Pedro Galvez, 25 June 1862
José Santos Castañeda, 27 October 1862
Ignacio Novoa, 10 April 1863
Julián Zarancondegui, 11 August 1864
Felipe Barriga Alvarez, 5 September 1864
Pedro Mariano García, 14 October 1864
José García Urrutia, 23 November 1864
Pedro José Carrillo, 4 April 1865
José Jorge Loayza, 14 July 1865
José Manuel de la Puente, 10 November 1865
Tomás de Vivero, 16 November 1865
Manuel Pardo, 28 November 1865
José Narciso de Campos, 2 March 1867
Pedro Paz Soldán, 3 June 1867
Juan Manuel Solar, 7 January 1868
José Luis Gómez Sánchez, 26 January 1868
Juan Ignacio Elguera, 3 April 1868
Francisco García Calderón, 4 August 1868
Nicolás de Piérola, 5 January 1869
Manuel Angulo, 26 October 1869
Nicolás de Piérola, 26 February 1870
Camilo Carrillo, 21 July 1871
Felipe Masías, 20 September 1871
José de la Riva-Agüero y Looz-Corswarem, 27 July 1872
José María de la Jara, 3 August 1872
Camilo Carrillo, 7 November 1873
Juan Ignacio Elguera, 26 May 1874
José N. Aranibar, 2 August 1876
José Felix García, 8 June 1877
Manuel Antonio Barinaga, 19 June 1878
José Rafael de Iscue, 25 October 1878
Emilio A. del Solar, 15 July 1879
José María Quimper, 24 July 1879
Juan Francisco Pazos, 5 September 1879
Aurelio Denegri, 29 October 1879
José María Quimper, 1 November 1879
Manuel Antonio Barinaga, 24 December 1879
Aurelio García y García, 16 January 1881
Aurelio Denegri, 12 March 1881
Lorenzo Iglesias, 3 January 1883
Elías Malpartida, 15 September 1883
Manuel Galup, 20 November 1883
Pedro Correa Santiago, 3 December 1885
Luis N. Bryce y Vivero, 3 June 1886
José N. Aranibar, 6 October 1886
Manuel Irigoyen Larrea, 22 November 1886
Mariano Santos Álvarez Villegas, 22 August 1887
Antero Aspíllaga, 9 November 1887
Eulogio Delgado, 8 March 1889
Ismael de la Quintana, 10 August 1890
Manuel Carbajal, 24 August 1891
Rafael Quiróz, 1 July 1892
José Salvador Cavero Ovalle, 3 March 1893
Eugenio Marquesado, 12 May 1893
Agustín de la Torre Gonzáles, 28 September 1893
Melitón Carvajal, 30 January 1894
José Agustín de la Puente, 2 April 1894
Horacio Ferreccio, 18 June 1894
Nicanor Carmona, 11 August 1894
Elías Malpartida, 20 March 1895
Federico Bresani, 9 September 1895
Manuel Jesús Obín, 30 November 1895
Ignacio Rey, 10 August 1896
Mariano A. Belaunde, 8 September 1899
Rafael Quiróz, 8 August 1900
José V. Larrabure, 31 August 1900
Domingo M. Almenara Butler, 2 October 1900
Adrián Ward, 12 September 1901
José Reynoso, 9 August 1902
Pablo Sarria, 4 November 1902
Augusto B. Leguía, 8 September 1903
Juan José Reynoso, 15 May 1904
Augusto B. Leguía, 24 September 1904
Germán Schreiber Waddington, 2 August 1907
Eulogio Y. Romero, 24 September 1908
Agustín de la Torre Gonzáles, 8 June 1909
Carlos Forero, 3 November 1909
Severiano Bezada, 3 January 1910
Germán Schreiber Waddington, 14 March 1910
Enrigue Oyanguren, 3 November 1910
Daniel Castillo, 1 September 1911
Ernesto L. Raez, 17 October 1911
Flavio A. Castañeda, 16 August 1912
Baldomero F. Maldonado, 24 September 1912
Felipe Derteano, 25 February 1913
José Balta Paz, 17 June 1913
Baldomero F. Maldonado, 27 July 1913
José Balta Paz, 4 February 1914
Luis F. Villarán, 15 May 1914
Francisco Tudela y Varela, 22 August 1914
Aurelio Sousa Matute, 22 September 1914
Germán Schreiber Waddington, 11 November 1914
Enrigue Oyanguren, 18 February 1915
Aurelio García y Lastres, 18 August 1915
Baldomero F. Maldonado, 27 July 1917
Germán Arenas Zuñiga, 26 February 1918
Victor M. Maúrtua, 22 April 1918
Héctor Escardó, 18 December 1918
Ismael de Idiáquez, 4 July 1919
Fernando C. Fuchs, 12 August 1919
M. A. Rodriguez Dulanto, 7 March 1919
Marcial Pastor, 5 May 1924
Enrigue de la Piedra, 12 October 1924
Benjamín Huamán de los Heros, 19 June 1925
Manuel G. Masías, 24 September 1925
Fernando C, Fuchs, 1 August 1930
Ricardo E. Llona, 25 August 1930
Manuel Augusto Olaechea, 2 November 1930
Pedro Bustamante y Santisteban, 31 January 1931
Gerardo Balbuena, 24 February 1931
Manuel A. Vinelli, 11 March 1931
Emilio L. Gómez de la Torre, 23 July 1931
José G. Cateriano, 8 December 1931
Francisco R. Lanatta, 29 January 1932
Ignacio A. Brandariz, 13 April 1932
Alfredo Solf y Muro, 29 June 1933
Benjamín Roca, 25 November 1933
Teófilo Iglesias Rodríguez, 24 October 1936
Benjamín Roca, 28 October 1937
Manuel Ugarteche Jiménez, 1 December 1938
David Dasso, 6 April 1940
Julio East, 24 August 1942
Rómulo Ferrero, 28 July 1945
Carlos Montero Bernales, 1 October 1945
Manuel Vasquez Díaz, 29 January 1946
Luis Echecopar García, 13 January 1947
Roque Augusto Saldías Maninat, 27 February 1948
Manuel B. Llosa, July 1948
Rómulo Ferrero, 17 September 1948
Luis Ramírez Ortíz, 27 October 1948
Emilio Pereyra Marquina, 27 October 1949
Andrés F. Dasso, 28 July 1950
Emilio Romero Padilla, 1 September 1952
Emilio Guimoye, 2 February 1954
Roque Augusto Saldías Maninat, 9 December 1955
Juan Pardo Heopen, July 1956
Augusto Thorndike Galup, 10 January 1958
Luis Gallo Porras, 10 June 1958
Pedro Beltrán Espantoso, September 1959
Alex Zarak R., 26 April 1961
Augusto Valdéz Oviedo, 17 July 1962
Javier Salazar Villanueva, 28 July 1963
Carlos Morales Macchiavello, September 1964
Sandro Mariátegui Chiappe, 15 September 1965
Tulio de Andrea Marcazzolo, 8 September 1967
Raúl Ferrero Rebagliati, 29 January 1968
Francisco Morales-Bermúdez, 20 March 1968
Manuel Ulloa Elías, 1 June 1968
Angel Valdivia Morriberón, 3 October 1968
Francisco Morales-Bermúdez, 3 March 1969
Guillermo Marcó del Pont, 2 January 1974
Amílcar Vargas Gavilano, 18 July 1974
Luis Barúa Castañeda, 2 September 1975
Walter Piazza Tanguis, 16 May 1977
Alcibiades Sáenz Barsallo, 6 July 1977
Javier Silva Ruete, 15 May 1978
Manuel Ulloa Elías, 28 July 1980
Carlos Rodriguez-Pastor Sr., 3 January 1983
José Benavides Muñoz, 21 March 1984
Guillermo Garrido Lecca Álvarez Calderón, 29 January 1985
Luis Alva Castro, 28 July 1985
Gustavo Saberbein, 28 July 1987
César Robles Freyre, 16 May 1988
Abel Salinas, 2 September 1988
Carlos Justo Rivas Dávila, 28 November 1988
César Vásquez Bazán, 15 May 1989
Juan Carlos Hurtado Miller, 28 July 1990
Carlos Boloña Behr, 15 February 1991
Jorge Camet Dickman, 8 January 1993
Jorge Baca Campodónico, 5 June 1998
Víctor Joy Way, 5 January 1999
Efraín Goldenberg, 15 October 1999
Carlos Boloña Behr, 28 July 2000
Javier Silva Ruete, 25 November 2000
Pedro Pablo Kuczynski, 28 July 2001
Javier Silva Ruete, 12 July 2002
Jaime Quijandría Salmón, 25 July 2003
Pedro Pablo Kuczynski, 16 February 2004
Fernando Zavala Lombardi, 16 August 2005
Luis Carranza, 28 July 2006
Luis Valdivieso Montano, 14 July 2008
Luis Carranza, 20 January 2009
Mercedes Aráoz Fernández, 22 December 2009
Ismael Benavides, 14 September 2010
Luis Miguel Castilla Rubio, 28 July 2011
Alonso Segura Vasi  , 15 September 2014
Alfredo Thorne Vetter, 28 July 2016
Fernando Zavala Lombardi, 23 June 2017
Claudia Cooper Fort, 18 September 2017
David Tuesta Cárdenas, 3 April 2018
Carlos Oliva Neyra, 8 June 2018
María Antonieta Alva Luperdi, 3 October 2019
José Arista, 12 November 2020
Waldo Mendoza Bellido, 18 November 2020
Pedro Francke Ballvé, 30 July 2021
Óscar Graham Yamahuchi, 1 February 2022
Kurt Burneo Farfán, 5 August 2022

See also
Council of Ministers of Peru
Government of Peru

References

External links
 Official website

Economy and Finance
Peru
Peru
Finance in Peru
Ministries established in 1821